Aloyzas is a masculine given name of Lithuanian origin. People with that name include:

 Aloyzas Kveinys (1962-2018), Lithuanian chess Grandmaster
 Aloyzas Sakalas (born 1931), Lithuanian politician
 Aloyzas Stasiulevičius (born 1931), Lithuanian painter, art teacher and critic

See also
 

Lithuanian masculine given names